Tasmania University Football Club (TUFC) is an Australian football club associated with the University of Tasmania. The Club currently plays in the Old Scholars Football Association.

The club was established in the 1930s, but did not participate in an organised competition until the late 1940s when it played in the Tasmanian Amateur Football League's southern division.

Tasmania born sports journalist and author Martin Flanagan played for the Tasmania University Football Club.

References

External links
 
 Blood, Sweat and Cheers: 70 years of the Tasmanian University Football Club 1936-2006, in University of Tasmania Alumni News, June 2006

Australian rules football clubs in Tasmania
football
Tasmania